Denis Love (1955-2012), was a Scottish international lawn bowler.

He won a gold medal for Scotland when he was part of the fours team at the 1990 Commonwealth Games in Auckland, New Zealand. The team consisted of George Adrain, Ian Bruce and Willie Wood.

References

Scottish male bowls players
1955 births
2012 deaths
Commonwealth Games medallists in lawn bowls
Commonwealth Games gold medallists for Scotland
Bowls players at the 1990 Commonwealth Games
Medallists at the 1990 Commonwealth Games